Wang Xiangrong (born 19 February 1972) is a Chinese athlete. She competed in the women's triple jump at the 1996 Summer Olympics.

References

1972 births
Living people
Athletes (track and field) at the 1996 Summer Olympics
Chinese female triple jumpers
Olympic athletes of China
Place of birth missing (living people)